The 1998 FIA GT Homestead 500 km was the ninth round the 1998 FIA GT Championship season.  It took place at the Homestead-Miami Speedway, Florida, United States on October 18, 1998.

Official results
Class winners are in bold.  Cars failing to complete 70% of winner's distance are marked as Not Classified (NC).

Statistics
 Pole position – #2 AMG Mercedes – 1:14.298
 Fastest lap – #1 AMG Mercedes – 1:16.495
 Average speed – 151.314 km/h

References

 
 

H
Homestead 500
FIA GT Homestead
FIA GT Homestead